The Croatian Special Operations Forces Command (Croatian: Zapovjedništvo specijalnih snaga OSRH) is one of the three independent commands of the Croatian Armed Forces, subordinate to the General Staff of the Armed Forces of the Republic of Croatia, whose mission is to ensure the combat readiness of the special operations forces for operations in defense of the territorial integrity, sovereignty and independence of the Republic of Croatia and to participate in NATO and coalition-led operations.

The Croatian Special Operations Forces Command was created from the Special Operations Battalion (BSD) which existed until December 2014, when in accordance with the provisions of the Long-Term Development Plan of the Armed Forces alongside the decree of the President of Croatia and the Supreme Commander of the Armed Forces, with the decision of the Minister of Defence and by the orders of the Chief of the General Staff of the Armed Forces, the process of reorganization of the Special Operations Battalion started and led to the subsequent establishment of the Croatian Special Operations Forces Command (CROSOFCOM) in February 2015. The goal of the reorganization was the creation of an interoperable and quickly deployable special operations forces that would be able to adequately respond to current and future security challenges.

In early February 2015, the Croatian Special Operations Forces Command was established, then consisting of five organizational units.

A subsequent reorganization of the CROSOFCOM followed in mid 2019 which saw an additional creation of three new Special Forces Groups, the 3rd, 4th and 5th Special Forces Groups respectively. Alongside the CROSOFCOM reorganization, the 194th Multipurpose Helicopter Squadron of the 91st Wing of the Croatian Air Force, stood up the 3rd Special Operations Aviation Platoon which will support the CROSOFCOM with its Mil Mi-171Sh helicopters until the arrival of new UH-60M Blackhawk helicopters in 2022.

The anniversary day of the Croatian Special Operations Forces Command is honored to the organization and the formation of the first special forces unit of the Croatian Armed Forces - the Zrinski Battalion, established on May 18, 1991.

History

The Zrinski Battalion (Croatian: Bojna Zrinski) was the first special forces unit of the Croatian National Guard (Croatian: Zbor narodne garde – ZNG) and later of the Croatian Army (Croatian: Hrvatska vojska - HV) established in Kumrovec on May 18, 1991, during the Croatian War of Independence.

On May 18, 1991, the Zrinski Battalion was established as a special forces unit of the ZNG. The core of the unit consisted of 27 volunteers drawn from the 300 strong Kumrovec Special Police Unit (Kumrovec SPU) with the addition of two members from the Lučko Anti-Terrorist Unit. Initially, it relied on former French Foreign Legion troops of Croatian origin. The most senior among the former legionnaires was Ante Roso, previously a Sous-Officier (non-commissioned officer – NCO) in the 4th Foreign Regiment. In consequence, Roso was tasked with setting up the unit as its initial commander. Major Miljenko Filipović, likewise a former French Foreign Legion NCO, was assigned as the battalions deputy commander. The unit was based in the village of Kumrovec in the region of Hrvatsko Zagorje, on the grounds of the former "Josip Broz Tito" political school, named after this communist dictator and lifetime "president" of communist SFRJ. The site, adjacent to the border of Slovenia, was selected to be inaccessible to Yugoslav Air Force raids without violation of Slovene or possibly Austrian airspace. In June 1991, the Kumrovec SPU was transferred to Sljeme Peak north of Zagreb leaving Kumrovec base to the Zrinski Battalion, as well as the second special forces unit, the Frankopan Battalion. Over the course of the war following additional recruitment and training of volunteers the unit reached the size of a company and at most had around 150 members. The unit suffered 26 KIA before being amalgamated with other special forces units of the Croatian Army to the 1. HGZ (Croatian: 1. hrvatski gardijski zdrug) in April 1994.

The Zrinski Battalion was deployed for the first time on June 15, 1991. It was stationed in Vukovar, tasked with preparation of city defences and organization and training of volunteer troops in Vukovar in June, 1991. In August Filipović took over command of the battalion from Roso. The same month, the Zrinski Battalion went to Banovina, where it pushed the Croatian Serb forces out of the town of Hrvatska Kostajnica. In September, the battalion was deployed to Gospić, where it took part in battle of Gospić against the JNA. Troops assigned to the battalion captured Kaniža barracks in Gospić. During combat in Gospić, 30 troops of the Zrinski Battalion, assisted by Lučko Anti-Terrorist Unit, captured JNA Major General Trajče Krstevski along with three BOV Armoured Personnel Carriers (APCs) and 32 soldiers. The unit was deployed to Metković on October 28, tasked with recapturing Slano from the JNA. After the deployment to Gospić, a part of the unit personnel left to Bosnia and Herzegovina anticipating further conflict there, while the remainder of the unit returned to Kumrovec. The ZNG was renamed the Croatian Army (Croatian: Hrvatska vojska – HV) on November 3, 1991. In late 1991, some of the personnel of the Zrinski Battalion were transferred to set up another special forces unit of the HV - the Matija Vlačić Battalion based in Opatija.

In 1992, elements of the Zrinski Battalion took part in the Battle of Kupres, before setting up a training camp in the town of Tomislavgrad. There the battalion personnel assisted in setting up and training the Croatian Defence Council (Croatian: Hrvatsko vijeće obrane - HVO). Later that year, elements of the battalion took part in Operation Tiger - aimed at lifting of the Siege of Dubrovnik.

In 1993, elements of the Zrinski Battalion took part in Operation Maslenica, fighting in the area of Škabrnja. The Central Intelligence Agency assessed the Zrinski Battalion as one of the best units of the HV.

On 25 February 1994, the Zrinski Battalion was amalgamated with parts of other special forces units of the HV: Frankopan Battalion, Ban Jelačić Battalion, Matija Vlačić Battalion, Ferdo Sučić Battalion, Alpha Battalion and parts of 8th Light Assault Brigade of the Croatian Military Police forming the 1st Croatian Guards Brigade (Croatian: 1. hrvatski gardijski zdrug), a component of the 1st Croatian Guards Corps (Croatian: 1. hrvatski gardijski zbor), directly subordinated to the Ministry of Defence rather than the General Staff of the Armed Forces of the Republic of Croatia.

The 1.HGZ took part in several important battles of the Croatian War of Independence and the Bosnian War. In late November and December 1994, it participated in Operation Winter '94, the joint offensive of the HV and the Croatian Defence Council (Croatian: Hrvatsko vijeće obrane - HVO) which pushed the Army of Republika Srpska (Croatian: Vojska Republike Srpske – VRS) from the western parts of the Livanjsko polje in Bosnia and Herzegovina. Elements of the HGZ also saw action along the Novska-Okučani axis of advance in the HV's Operation Flash offensive that took place in western Slavonia in early May 1995. By this time, the HGZ also commanded its own artillery and Mil Mi-24 helicopter gunships, in addition to Mil Mi-8 transport helicopters. The HGZ redeployed west of Livno once again in early June to take part in Operation Leap 2, extending the salient that had been created in late 1994 towards Bosansko Grahovo and Glamoč. The unit participated in the capture of those towns in late July, 1995 during Operation Summer '95.

In preparation for Operation Storm, the HV 4th Guards and 7th Guards Brigades were pulled back from positions facing the VRS that had been established during Operation Summer '95 and were repositioned south towards the Army of the Republic of Serb Krajina (ARSK). The ARSK was protecting the northern approaches to Knin − the capital of the unrecognized Republic of Serbian Krajina − which Croatia claimed as part of its own territory. As the two brigades turned over the positions north and west of Bosansko Grahovo to the HV 81st Guards Battalion, the 1. HGZ was deployed to the rear of the battalion, tasked with intervening in case of any VRS attack towards Bosansko Grahovo. On the second day of the operation, August 6, 1995 after Knin was captured by the HV, the HGZ was airlifted from the Livanjsko field to the village of Rovanjska north of Zadar. They then linked up with the 2nd Battalion Thermites of the 9th Guards Brigade and advanced east to capture the villages of Muškovac and Kaštel Žegarski. On August 8, the 1. HGZ participated in an operation against the last significant Army of the Republic of Serb Krajina pocket in the area of Donji Lapac and Srb, alongside the three guards brigades and special police forces.

In September 1995, the HGZ took part in Operation Mistral 2, which extended HV and Croatian Defence Council control in western Bosnia and Herzegovina and captured the towns of Jajce, Šipovo and Drvar, moving the confrontation line north towards the Bosnian Serb capital of Banja Luka. In October, the 1. During the Croatian War of Independence, 75 members of Zrinski Battalion, 1. HGZ and other special forces units of the Croatian Army were killed in action, 286 were wounded and 2 are MIA.

The 1. HGZ was disbanded in 2000 and its constituents were reorganized. A part of the HGZ was amalgamated with the Special Combat Skills Centre in Šepurine to form the Special Operations Battalion (Croatian: Bojna za specijalna djelovanja - BSD). The remainder of the unit was amalgamated with the Reconnaissance-Sabotage Company based in Pula, the 350th Sabotage Detachment, the 280th Unmanned Aerial Vehicle Platoon, and the 275th Electronic Warfare Company to form the 350th Military Intelligence Battalion. The elements of the 1st Croatian Guards Corps which were tasked with security of the President of Croatia and ceremonial duties were reorganized and the Honor Guard Battalion was established.

The Special Operations Battalion consisted of one command section and five companies, each specialized for a different variety of missions: 1st Special Operations Company specialized for airborne and pathfinder operations, 2nd Special Operations Company specialized for alpine and mountain operations, 3rd Special Operations Company specialized for naval and amphibious operations, 4th Special Operations Company specialized for urban and anti-terrorist operations and Fire Support Company specialized for sniper and mortar training and fire support with snipers to other four BSD companies.

The Special Operations Battalion reorganization and transformation into the Croatian Special Operations Forces Command was completed in February 2015.

Structure and Organization

Current organization 
Command Company - responsible for command, control and communications, supplies, medical personnel and transport
Training "Uskok" Company1st Commando Battalion "Zrinski"  - specialized for special operations on land, airborne and mountain2nd Combat Divers Battalion "Delte"  - specialized for special operations at sea3rd Special Operation Aviation Squadron - equipped with 8 Mi-17, 2 Sikorsky UH-60M all helicopters are to be equipped with M134Gs4th Special Air Operations Group -  is a SAS-like force trained for special operations in various environments. Specialized for counter-terrorism, hostage rescue, special operations on land, water, and air, VIP security operations.5th Psychological Operations Group - specialized in psychological operationsSupport company''' - provides all sorts of support needed for the everyday function of the CROSOFCOM. Also known to have a K9 section.
The Special Operations Forces Command combines capabilities through four complementary elements: command, operational, support and training elements.

The command element prepares and directs individuals, units and commands to operations / special operations or activities that have the character of operations. The command element is in support of the CAF chain of command in the planning and implementation of special operations, preparation and training of forces, strengthening the command at the strategic and operational level and performing other tasks of interest to the functioning of the CAF.

The operational element consists of the Special Forces Groups, one ground group (SO(L)TG) and one naval group (SO(M)TG), intended for planning and implementation of special operations, independently without support or with the support of other components of CROSOFCOM and the Croatian Armed Forces.

Special Forces Groups consist of a Command with S-1 to S-6 functions, Special Operations Task Units(SOTU), and a combat support platoon with combat support elements. Special Operations Forces teams are composed of 12 members who, in accordance with their tasks, develop the ability of (separate) independent action and reorganization of up to 24 members. The operational element also has a part of the forces grouped in the Commando Company which carries out operations independently or as part of other operational forces.

The support element is the holder of all forms of administrative and logistical support that are necessary for the daily functioning, life and work of the CROSOFCOM, and if necessary strengthens the Special Forces Group with the necessary support elements such as EOD specialists, K9 handlers etc.

The training element is the holder of Special Forces training, which includes selection and the qualification course, and training of advanced skills to Special Operations Forces operatives.

International cooperation
 United States Special Operations Command
 Special Operations Command Europe
 10th Special Forces Group
 19th Special Forces Group
 Naval Special Warfare Unit 2
 German Special Forces 
 Polish Special Forces
 UK Special Forces
 CEDC Special Forces

Gallery

References

Sources
Books

 

 

Scientific journal articles

News reports

 
 
 
 
 
 
 
 
 
 

Other sources

External links

 Croatian Armed Forces Official website
 Military forum Paluba
 
 
https://obris.org/hrvatska/hranj-moj-plan-za-os-rh/ 
https://narodne-novine.nn.hr/clanci/sluzbeni/2019_09_87_1753.html
https://obris.org/hrvatska/brigadir-milos-novi-zapovjednik-zss-a/
https://www.vecernji.hr/vijesti/evo-kako-se-specijaci-pripremaju-za-najslozenije-vojne-zadace-i-borbu-protiv-terorista-1414825

Military units and formations of Croatia
2015 establishments in Croatia
Military units and formations established in 2015
Counterterrorist organizations